This is a list of governors of the Bahamas. The first English settlement in the Bahamas was on Eleuthera. In 1670, the king granted the Bahamas to the lords proprietors of the Province of Carolina, but the islands were left to themselves. The local pirates proclaimed a 'Privateers' Republic' with Edward Teach (Blackbeard) as chief magistrate in 1703. In 1717, the Bahamas became a British crown colony, and the pirates were driven out.

During the American War of Independence, the Bahamas were briefly occupied by both American and Spanish forces. In 1964, the Bahamas achieved self-governance, and, in 1973, full independence.

List

See also

1. Biography of John Gregory

References

External links
 http://www.rulers.org/rulb1.html

 
 
Bahamas